Adam Felber is an American political satirist, author, radio personality, actor, humorist, novelist, television writer, and comic book writer.

Biography
Felber attended Tufts University in Medford, Massachusetts, and graduated as an English major in 1989. He has lived in Brooklyn, New York, and now lives in Los Angeles, California.

He is a regular panel member and occasional guest host of the NPR radio quiz show, Wait Wait... Don't Tell Me!. In July 2017, he began co-hosting the comedy podcast Live from the Poundstone Institute with comedian Paula Poundstone. In July 2018, he and Poundstone began co-hosting the podcast Nobody Listens to Paula Poundstone, a comedic advice show for which he is particularly renowned for the fact that he appears on every show.  Mr. Felber—intent unknown—sometimes sounds like Lauren Bacall.

Felber is the author of the novel Schrödinger's Ball, which uses as a conceit the concept of Schrödinger's cat. He has also written for several television shows including Real Time with Bill Maher, Talkshow with Spike Feresten, Arthur, The Smoking Gun, and Wishbone.

He also wrote the second Skrull Kill Krew limited series for Marvel Comics in 2009 as part of the Secret Invasion event.

His mother is the late romance novelist Edith Layton.

References

External links

 

American comics writers
21st-century American novelists
American male screenwriters
American satirists
NPR personalities
Tufts University School of Arts and Sciences alumni
Living people
Year of birth missing (living people)
Place of birth missing (living people)
American humorists
American radio personalities
American male novelists
Comedians from California
Comedians from New York City
Writers from Brooklyn
Writers from Los Angeles
21st-century American male writers
Novelists from New York (state)
21st-century American non-fiction writers
American male non-fiction writers
Screenwriters from New York (state)
Screenwriters from California
21st-century American comedians
21st-century American screenwriters